Panachaiki Volleyball Club is the volleyball department of Panachaiki, a multi-sport club based in Patras. It was founded in 1928. Its home is the Panachaiki Indoor Hall. In the 2013-14 season the team played in the A1 Ethniki (first division) for the first time.

History
Panachaiki participated in the 1937-38 Panhellenic championship. The final stage of this championship took place in Patras and the winner was E.A. Patras, the other volleyball Club of Patras. Panachaiki also took place in the 1961-62 Panhellenic championship but was disqualified early. Since the 1970s, Panachaiki has been mostly participating in Gamma and Beta Ethniki (fourth and third division respectively).  
In the 2007-08 season, it was promoted to the A2 Ethniki (second division) for the first time. In the 2012-13 season, they finished first of their group. After the end of the regular season, the team won the special ascension tournament and it was promoted to the A1 Ethniki for the first time. In the 2015-16 season Panachaiki finished in the 8th place of the Volleyball League, which is the team's most important success so far.

Recent seasons

References

External links
Panachaiki Volley Club Official site

Greek volleyball clubs